The Union of Cossacks is a movement of Russian and Central Asian cossacks established at a conference in Moscow on 28 June 1990, which sought to unite the Cossack forces of the earlier Russian Empire. The UoC defined itself as pro-communist, in contrast with the Union of Cossack Hosts whose stance favored the Russian Federation and opposed communism.

References

History of the Cossacks in Russia
1990 establishments in Russia
Organizations established in 1990